Jiefang District is a district of the city of Jiaozuo, Henan, China.

Administrative divisions
As 2012, this district is divided to 9 subdistricts.
Subdistricts

References

County-level divisions of Henan
Jiaozuo